The Università Cattolica del Sacro Cuore Library was established (founded) in 1921 by Agostino Gemelli, who based its design and organisation on that of highly prestigious foreign libraries.
All the libraries of the four UCSC campuses (Milan, Brescia, Piacenza-Cremona and Rome) use a centralized general catalogue.

History

The library of the Milan office, present since the founding of the university in 1921 with capital of 50,000 volumes, is the largest and oldest of the libraries of the whole university.

The library of Milan boasts in its library also numerous special funds. The collection consists of Sumerian tablets, Egyptian papyri (Papyrus 88), an original diploma of Matilde di Canossa (9 January 1106), a group of 30 manuscripts, an incunabulum, 60 books printed in the 16th century and a collection of 18th- and 19th-century editions of literature and historiography, the first edition of "The Betrothed".

Libraries in the UCSC system
The library consists of a central library with deposit, 8 branch libraries (located at institutes and departments), some special libraries, the reference room "Joseph Billanovich" and 12 reading rooms.

References

External links

Official website

Università Cattolica del Sacro Cuore
Academic libraries in Italy
Libraries established in 1921